The Audrey Jeffers Highway is a highway in Trinidad and Tobago.  It runs west from Downtown Port of Spain to Cocorite.  The highway runs from the Hasely Crawford Stadium to the Cocorite area parallel to Mucurapo Road and the Western Main Road in St. James.  It is named in honour of Audrey Jeffers, a social worker and Trinidad and Tobago's first female Member of Parliament.

Exit List
The following table lists the major junctions along the Audrey Jeffers Highway. The entire route is located in Trinidad. 

Roads in Trinidad and Tobago